The 1975 Five Nations Championship was the forty-sixth series of the rugby union Five Nations Championship. Including the previous incarnations as the Home Nations and Five Nations, this was the eighty-first series of the northern hemisphere rugby union championship. Ten matches were played between 18 January and 15 March. It was contested by England, France, Ireland, Scotland, and Wales. The championship was won by Wales, the team's eighteenth title (excluding another nine shared championships).

The game between Scotland and Wales at the Murrayfield Stadium in Edinburgh on 1 March attracted a World Record rugby attendance of 104,000 fans. This record would not be broken until a Bledisloe Cup game between Australia and New Zealand attracted 107,042 to the Sydney Olympic Stadium in 1999. The attendance at Murrayfield remains the Championship's record crowd, the record attendance in Europe and the third highest rugby attendance in history. With Scotland winning 12-10 it was the only loss for the Welsh during the 1975 Five Nations.

Participants
The teams involved were:

Table

Squads

Results

 Source - Quinn, Encyclopaedia of World Rugby

References

1975 Five Nations results

External links

The official RBS Six Nations Site

Six Nations Championship seasons
Five Nations
Five Nations
Five Nations
Five Nations
Five Nations
Five Nations
 
Five Nations
Five Nations
Five Nations